Vice-Admiral Sir John Gilchrist Thesiger Inglis,  (8 June 1906 – 29 October 1972), sometimes known as Tommy Inglis, was a Royal Navy officer who served as Director of Naval Intelligence from 1954 to 1960. In this capacity, he attempted to cover-up the "Buster Crabb affair" in 1956.

Family
Inglis was born in Frittenden, near Cranbrook, Kent, the second child and only son of Rev. Rupert Inglis (1863–1916) and Helen Mary Gilchrist. His father was a former England international rugby player who became a chaplain to the British Army and was killed during the Battle of the Somme.

In 1945, Inglis married Maude Dorrien "Frankie" Frankland; they had one daughter, Sarah (born 1948), who married twice, first to Hugh Poole-Warren and then to Brig. Hedley Duncan, who was Yeoman Usher of the Black Rod until his retirement in March 2009.

His cousin, Frank Inglis was head of RAF Intelligence during the Second World War.

Naval career
Inglis was educated at the Royal Naval Colleges at Osborne and Dartmouth. He graduated as a midshipman in May 1924 and first saw service on the  light cruiser  with the Atlantic Fleet between September 1924 and January 1925.

In November 1925, he was posted to the battlecruiser  until May 1926. He was then promoted to (acting) sub-lieutenant in September 1926 before attending a promotion course at the Royal Naval College, Greenwich until July 1927. In April 1929 he was promoted to lieutenant. He then returned to the Atlantic Fleet on board the  heavy cruiser  until February 1931.

In December 1931, he qualified for signal duties at HM Signal School, Portsmouth. Having been promoted to the rank of lieutenant commander in April 1937, he served as flag lieutenant-commander to Vice-Admiral John Tovey, the commander of the destroyer flotillas of the Mediterranean Fleet and then as squadron signal and wireless/telegraphy officer on board the destroyer depot ship , later transferring to the  light cruiser .

Following the outbreak of the Second World War, he continued to serve under Vice-Admiral Tovey, on board  until April 1940. In December 1940, he was promoted to commander and, in August 1941, he was posted as fleet wireless/telegraphy officer with the Home Fleet on board , before transferring to its sister ship, .

As captain, his first command came in October 1945 on the escort carrier .

He then returned to the U.K. to take up the post of captain of the Signals School at HMS Mercury from September 1950 until October 1951.

In July 1954, he was promoted to rear admiral and appointed Director of Naval Intelligence, in which role he served until his retirement in January 1960, having reached the rank of vice admiral in January 1958.

"Buster Crabb Affair"

In April 1956, the Soviet leaders Nikita Khrushchev and Nikolai Bulganin visited England on a diplomatic mission on board the cruiser . While the vessel was in Portsmouth, a former Royal Navy diver Lionel "Buster" Crabb was recruited to investigate her propeller. On 19 April, Crabb dived into the harbour and disappeared in mysterious circumstances; ten days later British newspapers published stories about Crabb's disappearance in an underwater mission. The incident caused a major diplomatic row, with the Russians accusing British Intelligence of a bungled attempt to spy on their warship.

As Crabb was no longer an enlisted sailor and the Royal Navy had not been officially involved, the Admiralty had difficulty in producing any credible explanation for Crabb's disappearance. On 27 April, Inglis (as Director of Naval Intelligence), instructed the Admiralty to announce that Crabb had been specially employed in connection with trials of certain underwater apparatus; he had not returned from a test dive in Stokes Bay and must be presumed drowned. This explanation was clearly not in accordance with the known facts and the British prime minister Anthony Eden was challenged on the matter in Parliament on 14 May; Eden released a statement that It would not be in the public interest to disclose the circumstances in which Commander Crabb is presumed to have met his death. I think it necessary, in the special circumstances of this case, to make it clear that what was done was done without the authority or the knowledge of Her Majesty's Ministers.  Appropriate disciplinary steps are being taken.

On 21 June, Inglis issued a memo explaining that the Royal Navy "considered it essential" to avoid implicating top officers in Portsmouth; in a "bona fide" operation, there would have been "immediate and extensive rescue operations" but these were not possible because "a search could not be carried out beside the Russian warships". Inglis pointed out that, instead, "the moment it became clear that a mishap had occurred (name blanked out) was ordered to return to his ship and take no further part in the affair". The memo mentions "discussions in Admiralty in search of a convincing cover story", and expresses concern that, if the unidentified serviceman had to testify in any legal proceedings, it would involve "further risk of compromise of the true nature of the operation".

Some of the Government papers relating to this incident were released in October 2006, fifty years later. These reveal that blame for the embarrassing intelligence failure fell on Inglis, as the director of naval intelligence. Inglis was censured, but he kept his job, and the two permanent secretaries were told they were guilty of an error of judgment in not informing ministers. Many of the Government documents regarding Crabb's disappearance are not scheduled to be released until 2057.

Honours
Inglis was appointed Officer of the Order of the British Empire in the 1943 New Year Honours, and Companion of the Order of the Bath (CB) in January 1957. Shortly before his retirement, he became a knight on promotion to Knight Commander of the Order of the British Empire (KBE) in the 1959 Queen's Birthday Honours.

References

External links
Full Naval history

1906 births
1972 deaths
People educated at the Royal Naval College, Osborne
Graduates of Britannia Royal Naval College
People from the Borough of Tunbridge Wells
Royal Navy vice admirals
Knights Commander of the Order of the British Empire
Companions of the Order of the Bath
Directors of Naval Intelligence
Graduates of the Royal Naval College, Greenwich
Military personnel from Kent
Royal Navy personnel of World War II
Inglis family